Aleix Heredia (born 5 January 1992) is a Spanish modern pentathlete. He competed in the men's event at the 2020 Summer Olympics.

References

External links
 

1992 births
Living people
Spanish male modern pentathletes
Modern pentathletes at the 2020 Summer Olympics
Olympic modern pentathletes of Spain
Place of birth missing (living people)
Modern pentathletes at the 2010 Summer Youth Olympics